Professor G. Ram Reddy (December 4, 1929 – July 2, 1995) was a renowned architect of Distance Education and the father of open learning in India.

References
20th Century Luminaries of Andhra Pradesh, Potti Sriramulu Telugu University, Hyderabad, 2005.

External links
.
Osmania University Centre for Distance Education official website.

Telugu people
1929 births
1995 deaths
People from Karimnagar district